Mina interpretata da Mina is a compilation album by Italian singer Mina, issued in 1965. 

The songs of this album were all taken from the albums published by Italdisc between 1960 and 1963.

Track listing

Side A

Side B

1965 compilation albums
Italian-language compilation albums
Mina (Italian singer) compilation albums